Theo Püll (born 30 September 1936) is a German athlete. He competed in the men's high jump at the 1960 Summer Olympics.

References

External links
 

1936 births
Living people
Athletes (track and field) at the 1960 Summer Olympics
German male high jumpers
Olympic athletes of the United Team of Germany
People from Viersen
Sportspeople from Düsseldorf (region)